D.C. Hall was an American head coach for the University of Oklahoma Sooners men's basketball team in 1908.  He attended Brown University as an undergraduate.  While at Brown he became a champion runner.

After graduating from Brown, he went on to become the head coach of the men's basketball team at the University of Oklahoma and to generally supervise men's athletics while there.

Head coaching record

References

Oklahoma Sooners men's basketball coaches
College men's basketball head coaches in the United States